Strategic Plans Division Force or (SPD Force) is Pakistan's agency responsible for the protection of its tactical and strategic nuclear weapons stockpile and the strategic assets. It is the security branch of the National Command Authority (NCA), the department currently has 170 nuclear stockpiles and many strategic and tactical delivery systems ( missiles), for target acquisition reconnaissance and surveillance BeiDou satellite navigation system and many UAVs and UCAVs ( i.e NESCOM-BURRAQ, GIDS-Shahpar, GIDS Uqab etc) are used. SPD Force has a three star general as its DG and is under direct command of Strategic Plans Division.

Role 
The force's primary task is provision of security to country's strategic infrastructure such as nuclear and missile research and production sites, space installations etc such as, KRL, PAEC, PNRA, NESCOM and SUPARCO.

Organization 
SPD is commanded by serving Lieutenant General of Pakistan Army who acts as Director General of Strategic Plans Division. The force (SPD force)is commanded by serving Major General of Pakistan Army who acts as Director General of Strategic Plans Division Force.There are four security directorates for each strategic organization and each directorate is led by Brigadier.

Initially, manpower for security of country's strategic assets was provided by Pakistan's Armed Forces but now SPD has started hiring its own personnel. The selection standards in terms of intelligence and physical standards for these candidates are even higher than army due to very sensitive nature of their duty. At start, these recruits were trained at Pakistan Army's training centers but since 2012 SPD has been training these recruits in its own academy known as Pakistan’s Centre of Excellence for Nuclear Security (PCENS) located in Chakri near Rawalpindi. This training facility is modeled on US National Nuclear Security Administration's academy.

Special Response Force 
Special Response Force (SRF) is the special forces unit of SPD Force with the strength of 25,000 personnel. SRF is based on training techniques of SSG and has retired SSG commandos as training staff.

Weapons
SPD Force's primary weapons are G3, Type 56 and Type 81 assault rifles.

Director Generals SPD

References

Nuclear safety and security
Pakistan Army
Strategic forces of Pakistan
Nuclear security agencies